Isabel Bishop is an EP by Washington, D.C. indie band Unrest, released on August 24, 1993 by 4AD.

Track listing

Personnel
Adapted from the Isabel Bishop liner notes.

Unrest
Bridget Cross – bass guitar
Phil Krauth – drums
Mark Robinson – vocals, guitar

Additional musicians and production
Calvin Johnson – production (5)
Terry Tolkin – production (6)
Wharton Tiers – production (1, 2, 3, 4, 7)

Release history

References

External links
 

1993 debut EPs
4AD albums
Albums produced by Wharton Tiers
Unrest (band) albums